Karua or Kerva may refer to:
 Kerva, Mazandaran